The English royal consorts listed here were the spouses of the reigning monarchs of the Kingdom of England, excluding the joint rulers, Mary I and Philip who reigned together in the 16th century, and William III and Mary II who reigned together in the 17th century.

Most of the consorts were women, and enjoyed titles and honours pertaining to a queen consort; some few were men, whose titles were not consistent, depending upon the circumstances of their spouses' reigns. The Kingdom of England merged with the Kingdom of Scotland in 1707, to form the Kingdom of Great Britain. There have thus been no consorts of England since that date.

House of Wessex, 886–1013

House of Denmark, 1013–1014

House of Wessex (restored, first time), 1014–1016

House of Denmark (restored), 1016–1042

House of Wessex (restored, second time), 1042–1066

House of Normandy, 1066–1135, & 1141
In 1066, the Duke of Normandy, William, killed King Harold II of England at the battle of Hastings, and overthrew the English elite. He established himself as King, his wife Matilda as Queen consort, and beneficed his faithful vassals from the continent. His dynasty would not, however, outlive his children, becoming defunct with the death of his youngest son, Henry I, in 1135.

House of Blois, 1135–1154
In 1135, Stephen of Blois, the son of Henry I's sister Adela, seized the English throne, his cousin Empress Matilda of Anjou's claims being ignored by the Norman barons. His wife, Matilda of Boulogne, became his Queen consort, but her elder son died, and Stephen was forced to appoint the Empress's son as his successor.

House of Plantagenet, 1154–1485

House of Lancaster, 1399–1461, 1470–1471

House of York, 1461–1470, 1471–1485

House of Tudor, 1485–1603

Disputed consort 
Since Lady Jane Grey was briefly queen de facto, her husband is included here. They were both executed for treason.

House of Stuart, 1603–1707
With the death of Elizabeth I, the crown of England passed to her cousin and nearest heir, James VI of Scotland, who became James I of England. His dynasty would rule - interrupted by the Interregnum between 1649 and 1660 – until 1714. The Kingdom of England, however, was merged with the Kingdom of Scotland in 1707, to form a new Kingdom, the Kingdom of Great Britain, after which there ceased to be monarchs and consorts of England.

Jacobite pretenders
Despite the deposition of James II in 1689, he and his descendants continued to claim the thrones of England, Scotland, and Ireland for more than a century afterwards. This claim was, when politically suitable, recognised by some other European monarchs. As the Stuart pretenders considered the government of England after 1688 to be illegitimate, they did not recognise the validity of the union of the English and Scottish crowns in 1707, or the union with Ireland in 1801.

Other consorts of pretenders

Continuation of the list (British consorts)
This list continues at List of British royal consorts.

See also
List of Wessex consorts
List of British royal consorts
List of Scottish consorts
List of Irish royal consorts
List of Aquitanian consorts
Duchess of Normandy
List of Angevin consorts
List of Hanoverian consorts

Notes

 
Lists of queens
Lists of royal consorts